Paradise Road is a 1936 Czech drama film directed by Martin Frič. Frič also directed a German-language version  in the same year.

Cast
 Hugo Haas as Tobiás
 Vladimír Jedlicka as Petrícek
 Zdeněk Štěpánek as Gustav
 Hana Vítová as Anicka
 Svetla Svozilová as Sona
 Jiří Dohnal as Emil
 Bedřich Vrbský as Broz
 Zita Kabátová as Brozová
 Theodor Pištěk
 Stanislav Neumann
 Jaroslav Průcha

References

External links
 

1936 films
1936 drama films
1936 multilingual films
1930s Czech-language films
Czechoslovak black-and-white films
Czechoslovak multilingual films
Czechoslovak drama films
Films directed by Martin Frič
1930s Czech films